Bartlett Mangum House, also known as Clair's Cafe, is a historic home located at Durham, Durham County, North Carolina.  It was built in 1908, and is a -story, Classical Revival style frame dwelling.  It consists of the main block, three bays wide and two bays deep, with projecting polygonal side bays and a one-story rear ell. It features a high hipped roof, projecting gabled dormers and tall chimneys, and a two-tier portico carried by massive stuccoed Doric order columns.  After ceasing residential usage in the 1960s, the building has housed a church, a retail clothes store, and restaurant.

It was listed on the National Register of Historic Places in 1989.

References

External links
Four Square Restaurant website

Houses on the National Register of Historic Places in North Carolina
Neoclassical architecture in North Carolina
Houses completed in 1908
Houses in Durham, North Carolina
National Register of Historic Places in Durham County, North Carolina
1908 establishments in North Carolina